The T.O. Show is an American reality television series that premiered on VH1 on July 20, 2009. It follows Owens and his friend (Monique Jackson) and publicist (Kita Williams) as they re-evaluate Owens' personal life, while battling the two sides of his personality and also trying to find romance for him.

On September 9, 2009, VH1 announced that the series has been picked up for a second season. Season Two premiered on VH1 on July 11, 2010.

On February 28, 2011, VH1 announced that the series has been picked up for a third season. The series relocated to Miami. The third season premiered on August 22, 2011.

Cast

Main cast
 Terrell Owens is a free agent wide receiver in the National Football League. He is a six-time Pro-Bowl selection.
 Kita Williams, one of Terrell's best friends to help him match his NFL achievements with similar success off the field. The public relations company she founded with partner Monique Jackson, Kita functions as matchmaker, therapist, and best friend while managing the Terrell Owens Brand. Kita is single and is a member of the National Association of Black Female Executives in Music and Entertainment. She is a graduate of the University of Kentucky and also holds an MBA from the University of Phoenix.
 Monique Jackson, one of Terrell's best friends.  Jackson founded a public relations company with her business partner Kita Williams. Servicing superstar client Terrell Owens, Jackson and Williams manage all aspects of the Owens brand, including marketing, promotions, and public relations. She's Known as "Momma Mo" for her ability to nurture and encourage clients to be their best, Mo attributes her career vector to her childhood dreams of becoming "a minister, a nurse and an entertainer."

Supporting cast
 Kari Klinkenborg,  (season 1-present)
 Felisha Terrell, is Terrell's ex-fiancée. (season 1-present)
 Pablo Cosby, is Terrell's former body guard. (season 1)

Guest Appearances
 Andy Roddick, a professional tennis player.
 Chad Ochocinco, an American football wide receiver who is currently a free agent.
 Donovan McNabb, a former American football quarterback.
 Jessica White, a model and occasional actress.
 Matthew Hatchette, an American football player.
 Tatyana Ali, a singer and actress.

Episodes

Season 1 (2009)

Season 2 (2010)

Season 3 (2011)

References

External links
 
 

2000s American reality television series
2009 American television series debuts
VH1 original programming
2010s American reality television series
2011 American television series endings
English-language television shows
African-American reality television series